1999 Emperor's Cup Final was the 79th final of the Emperor's Cup competition. The final was played at National Stadium in Tokyo on January 1, 2000. Nagoya Grampus Eight won the championship.

Overview
Nagoya Grampus Eight won their 2nd title, by defeating Sanfrecce Hiroshima – with Wagner Lopes and Stojković goal.

Match details

See also
1999 Emperor's Cup

References

1999 Final
1999 in Japanese football
Nagoya Grampus matches
Sanfrecce Hiroshima matches